Siphiwe Gloria Ndlovu (born 1977) is a Zimbabwe-born novelist and filmmaker.

Background 
She was born and partly grew up in the city of Bulawayo. A few months after she was born, Ndlovu's family moved to Sweden as political refugees, and this is where she spent the formative years of her life. The family then moved to the United States, and returned to Zimbabwe after 1980 when the country had attained its independence. She attended Girls College and thereafter went to the US to pursue her university studies in Boston, Massachusetts (Emerson College); Athens, Ohio (Ohio University) and Palo Alto, California (Stanford University). She spent 18 years in the US, before she decided to move back to Africa where she lived between South Africa and Zimbabwe.

Writing career 
Ndlovu's fiction has gained critical acclaim since she entered the scene in 2018. Her debut book, The Theory of Flight  (2018) was soon followed by The History of Man (2020).  The two books have won praise, made it on shortlists, and earned their author places at prestigious fellowships around the world. Besides creative writing, Ndlovu is a trained literary scholar. She is also a filmmaker, her films have premiered at the Zanzibar International Film Festival among others.

Awards and honours 
 Miles Morland Writing Scholarship (2018)
 Sunday Times Fiction Prize (2019) for The Theory of Flight
 Windham–Campbell Prize (2022) category of fiction

Publications 
 The Theory of Flight (Penguin Random House, 2018)
 The History of Man (Penguin Random House, 2020)

References 

1977 births
Living people
Zimbabwean novelists
Zimbabwean women writers
Zimbabwean filmmakers